Canada Lee (born Leonard Lionel Cornelius Canegata; March 3, 1907 – May 9, 1952) was an American professional boxer and then an actor who pioneered roles for African Americans. After careers as a jockey, boxer and musician, he became an actor in the Federal Theatre Project, including the 1936 production of Macbeth adapted and directed by Orson Welles. Lee later starred in Welles's original Broadway production of Native Son (1941). A champion of civil rights in the 1930s and 1940s, Lee was blacklisted and died shortly before he was scheduled to appear before the House Un-American Activities Committee. He advanced the African American tradition in theatre pioneered by such actors as Paul Robeson. Lee was the father of actor Carl Lee.

Biography

Early life
Lee was born Leonard Lionel Cornelius Canegata on March 3, 1907, in the San Juan Hill neighborhood of Manhattan in New York City. His father, James Cornelius Lionel Canegata, was born on the Caribbean island of St. Croix, and as a youth had migrated to New York, where he married Lydia Whaley Gadsen. Raised by his parents in Harlem, Lee had an aptitude for music, and at age seven he began studying violin and piano with J. Rosamond Johnson at the Music School Settlement for Colored People. He made his concert debut at age 11, performing a student recital at Aeolian Hall. But after seven years of music studies, without explanation, he put away his violin and ran away from home. In 1921, aged 14, Lee went to Saratoga Springs, New York, and began a two-year career as a jockey.

Lee returned to his parents' home in Harlem in 1923 with no idea what he was going to do next. He considered returning to music, but an old school friend suggested that he try boxing. At one amateur match, fight announcer Joe Humphries saw the name "Canagata, Lee" on the card he was using. He tossed the card aside and instead announced "Canada Lee"—a name that Lee liked and adopted. In the amateur ring he won 90 out of 100 bouts and the national amateur lightweight title.

Professional boxer
Lee turned pro at age 19, in October 1926, and became a favorite with audiences. 
His boxing statistics vary due to incomplete coverage and record keeping for the sport in the 1920s and 1930s. Boxing historian Donald R. Koss documents Lee having 60 bouts 1927–31, the majority of them taking place 1927–28. The New York Times reported that Lee had some 200 professional matches and lost only about 25.

During his victorious 10-round bout with Andy Divodi at Madison Square Garden on December 12, 1929, Lee was dealt a blow over his right ear that detached his retina. With treatment his vision could have been saved, but Lee feared losing his successful career and masked his injury. In time he lost all sight in his right eye. He quit professional boxing in 1933. 

Despite having made an estimated $90,000 during his boxing career (roughly equivalent to $ million today), Lee was broke. "Just threw it away," Lee later said. Lee eventually lobbied for insurance, health care, financial consultation and retirement homes for fighters. "The average boxer possesses little education," he said in 1946. "If he winds up broke, he has no trade, no education and nobody to turn to."

As Lee's fighting career began to wind down, he put together a small dance band that played at obscure clubs. When an old friend, sportswriter Ed Sullivan, plugged him in his new entertainment column, Lee and his group began landing better engagements. His career as a bandleader peaked in 1933 when his group played at the Lafayette Theatre in Harlem. The following year he opened his own small club, The Jitterbug, which he managed to operate for six months. When it closed he had no prospects, and his mother convinced him to simply get a job.

Acting

Lee discovered a love for Broadway theatre during his years as a prizefighter. He remembered Show Boat as the first stage production he ever saw: "A big, tough fighter, all muscle, just sobbing," he recalled.

His acting career began by accident in 1934. While at a YMCA to apply for a job as a laborer, Lee stumbled upon an audition in progress and was recognized by playwright Augustus Smith. Lee was invited to try out, and won a supporting role in Brother Mose, directed by Frank H. Wilson. Sponsored by New York's Civil Works Administration, the show toured the boroughs, playing at community centers and city parks into the fall of the year. In October 1934, Lee succeeded Rex Ingram in the Theatre Union's revival of Stevedore, which toured to Chicago, Detroit and other U.S. cities after its run on Broadway. It was his first professional role.

Lee then was cast in his first major role, Banquo, in the legendary Federal Theatre Project production of Macbeth (1936), adapted and directed by Orson Welles.

"I never would have amounted to anything in the theatre if it hadn't been for Orson Welles," Lee recalled. "The way I looked at acting, it was interesting and it was certainly better than going hungry. But I didn't have a serious approach to it until … I bumped into Orson Welles. He was putting on a Federal Theatre production of Macbeth with Negro players and, somehow, I won the part of Banquo. He rehearsed us for six solid months, but when the play finally went on before an audience, it was right—and it was a wonderful sensation, knowing it was right. Suddenly, the theatre became important to me. I had a respect for it, for what it could say. I had the ambition—I caught it from Orson Welles—to work like mad and be a convincing actor."

Macbeth was sold out for ten weeks at the Lafayette Theatre. After an additional two weeks on Broadway it toured the nation, including performances at the Texas Centennial Exposition in Dallas.
 
After five months in a supporting role, Lee succeeded Rex Ingram as the lead in the stage production Haiti (1938), portraying Haitian slave turned emperor Henri Christophe. One of the Federal Theatre Project's most popular productions, Haiti was seen by some 90,000 people at the Lafayette Theatre in Harlem and at Boston's Copley Theatre.

In January 1939, with the end of the Federal Theatre Project, Lee gained a role in Mamba's Daughters, a Broadway success that toured North America and returned to Broadway for another brief run in 1940. Lee took a break from the road tour to make his motion picture debut in Keep Punching (1939), a film about boxing. He made his radio debut as narrator of the weekly CBS jazz series Flow Gently, Sweet Rhythm (1940–41). As that regular series came to an end, he opened a restaurant at 102 West 136th Street, Canada Lee's Chicken Coop, which offered authentic South Carolina cuisine, jazz and blues. Lee kept it going despite chronic financial difficulties.

Lee played the lead role in the 1940 revival of Theodore Ward's Big White Fog. A 1938 Federal Theatre Project production, the play was remounted by the newly created Negro Playwrights Company, founded in New York by Ward, Langston Hughes, Paul Robeson, Theodore Browne, Richard Wright and Alain Locke.

Lee became a star overnight in his ultimate stage success, Native Son (1941), an adaptation of Richard Wright's novel staged on Broadway by Orson Welles. The show was a spectacular hit for both Welles and Lee, who starred in the initial New York run, a 19-month national tour, and a second run on Broadway with accessible ticket prices. "Mr. Lee's performance is superb," wrote Brooks Atkinson of The New York Times, who called him "certainly the best Negro actor of his time, as well as one of the best actors in this country." Wright also applauded the performance, noting the contrast between Lee's affable personality and his intensity as Bigger Thomas. The sympathetic portrayal of a black man driven to murder by racial hatred brought much criticism however, especially from the Catholic Diocese of Brooklyn and the Legion of Decency, and the ensuing pressure forced the play to close.

During World War II, Lee continued to act in plays and in films. In 1942, he played in two comedies by William Saroyan, and earned approving reviews despite the generally negative response to these plays. In 1943, his name was above the title on the marquee for South Pacific, a race-themed drama directed by Lee Strasberg that again was panned by critics but won Lee critical praise.

Perhaps Lee's best known film role was in Alfred Hitchcock's Lifeboat (1944), in which he played ship's steward Joe Spencer, one of 8 men and women who survive the sinking of the freighter carrying them from New York to London and are joined in their lifeboat by a survivor of the crew of the U-boat that destroyed their vessel.

According to a June 22, 1943, Hollywood Reporter news item, Lee was the first actor cast for the film. The script was criticized for making Joe "too stereotypical". Lee testified that he attempted to round out the character by revising dialogue, primarily eliminating repeated "yessir"s and "nossir"s that sounded subservient, and cutting some actions. An NAACP critique of the film condemned the role of Joe and praised Lee’s performance. The Baltimore Afro-Americans review, while commenting on the character's shortcomings, praised Lee's portrayal. Historian Rebecca Sklaroff, while writing in 2009 that Joe's role was more "tokenistic" than black roles in the wartime films Sahara and Bataan, wrote that Joe was depicted as compassionate, dependable and heroic. He is the only one who resists the impulse of mob fury that leads the other characters to kill the German. He is the only character who steps forward to disarm the wounded German sailor rescued at the end of the film. 

Lee's successful radio career continued with New World A-Comin, which made its debut in March 1944. He narrated the first two seasons of the groundbreaking WMCA radio series that presented Negro history and culture to mainstream American audiences.

He became the first African American to play Caliban, in Margaret Webster's 1945 Broadway production of The Tempest. Lee had admired Shakespeare since his turn in Macbeth; indeed, at the time of his death he was preparing to play Othello on film.

In 1946, Lee played a principal role in On Whitman Avenue, a drama about racial prejudice directed by Margo Jones. Lee produced the play, making him the first African-American producer on Broadway. The play spoke directly to the need for interracial housing following World War II and won the praise of former First Lady Eleanor Roosevelt, who wrote weekly columns encouraging readers to see it.

In the autumn of 1946, Lee made American theatre history when he portrayed the villain Daniel de Bosola in John Webster's The Duchess of Malfi. Presented in Boston and on Broadway, the production marked the first time a black actor had played a white role on the stage. Lee wore a special white paste that had been used medically, to cover burns and marks, but had never before been used in the theatre. He had a supporting role in Robert Rossen's Body and Soul (1947), another boxing picture.

In 1948, Lee played his last stage role, that of a devoted slave in Set My People Free, Dorothy Heyward's drama based on the aborted 1822 slave revolt led by Denmark Vesey.

In 1949, he took a supporting role in Lost Boundaries, a drama based on William Lindsay White's book of the same title, a nonfiction account of Dr. Albert C. Johnston and his family, who passed for white while living in New England in the 1930s and 1940s. 

Lee's last film appearance was the starring role of minister Stephen Kumalo in Cry, the Beloved Country (1951).

Civil rights activism
As an actor, Lee came into contact with many of the leading progressive figures in the country. Langston Hughes, for instance, wrote two brief plays for Lee; these were submitted to the Theater Project, but their criticism of racism in America was deemed too controversial, and neither was staged. Lee spoke to schools, sponsored various humanitarian events, and began speaking directly against the existing segregation in America's armed forces, while simultaneously acknowledging the need to win World War II. To this latter end, he appeared at numerous USO events; he won an award from the United States Recruiting Office and another from the Treasury Department for his help in selling war bonds. These sentiments would carry on throughout his life, culminating in his early firsthand account of apartheid in South Africa.

Lee was an early influence on physician and human rights activist H. Jack Geiger. They met in 1940 when Geiger, a 14-year-old middle-class Jewish runaway, was backstage at a Broadway production of Native Son. Lee agreed to take Geiger in when he showed up at his door in Harlem asking for a place to stay. With the consent of his parents, Geiger stayed with Lee for over a year. Lee took on the role of surrogate father and introduced Geiger to Langston Hughes, Billy Strayhorn, Richard Wright, and Adam Clayton Powell. Geiger eventually became a journalist, then a doctor who co-founded the first community health center in the United States, Columbia Point Health Center in Dorchester, Massachusetts. He became a founder of Physicians for Social Responsibility and Physicians for Human Rights, and established community health centers in Mississippi and South Africa. Geiger says he would never have moved so deeply in these worlds so quickly if not for his experiences with Canada Lee.

By the late 1940s, the rising tide of anti-communism had made many of Lee's earlier contacts politically dangerous. In 1949, the trade journal Variety stated that under no circumstance was Lee to be used in American Tobacco’s televised production of a radio play he had recently starred in because he was "too controversial".

The same year, the FBI offered to clear Lee's name if he would publicly call Paul Robeson a communist. Lee refused and responded by saying, "All you’re trying to do is split my race." According to newspaper columnist Walter Winchell, Lee stated that he intended to come out and "publicly blast Paul Robeson." However, the fact that the friendship between the two actors remained until Lee's death suggests that Robeson put no faith in Winchell's claim.

At the height of the Hollywood blacklist, Lee managed to find work in 1950 as the star of a British film Cry, The Beloved Country, for which both he and Sidney Poitier were smuggled into South Africa as indentured servants in order to play their roles as African ministers. During filming, Lee had his first heart attack, and he never fully recovered his health. The film's message of universal brotherhood stands as Lee's final work towards this aim.

Being on the Hollywood blacklist prevented him from gaining further work. Scheduled to appear in Italy to begin production on a filmed version of Othello, he was repeatedly notified that his passport "remained under review". Lee was reportedly to star as Bigger Thomas in the Argentine version of Native Son but was replaced in the role by Richard Wright, author of the novel, when Lee had to withdraw.

Family life
In December 1925, Lee married Juanita Eugenia Waller. On November 22, 1926, they had a son, Carl Vincent Canegata, who became actor Carl Lee. The couple separated while their son was young, and they were amicably divorced in 1942.

In 1934, Lee began a love affair with publisher and peace activist Caresse Crosby, despite the threat of miscegenation laws. They often had lunch in uptown New York in Harlem at the then-new restaurant "Franks", where they could maintain their secret relationship. When Lee was performing in Washington, D.C., during the 1940s, the only restaurant in the city where they could eat together was an African restaurant named the Bugazi. Crosby and Lee's intimate relationship continued into the mid-1940s.

In March 1951, Lee married Frances Pollack. They remained together until he died just over a year later.

Death
Lee died of a reported heart attack at the age of 45 on May 9, 1952, in Manhattan.  It was later revealed by his widow, Frances Pollack, that he had been diagnosed with uremia and died of kidney disease, slipping into a coma and passing away 10 days after his diagnosis. He was buried at Woodlawn Cemetery in The Bronx.

Theatre credits

Film and television credits

Radio credits
{| class="wikitable"
|-
! Date
! Title
! Notes
|-
| April 7, 1940 – January 12, 1941
| Flow Gently, Sweet Rhythm
| Weekly 30-minute CBS Radio jazz series also called The John Kirby  ShowCast: Canada Lee (narrator), John Kirby, Charlie Shavers, Russ Procope, Buster Bailey, Billy Kyle, O'Neil Spencer, Maxine Sullivan, Ella Fitzgerald
|-
| April 13, 1941
| The Free Company
| "A Start in Life"Cast: Canada Lee, Luis Van Rooten, Georgette Harvey, Edna Mae Harris
|-
| May 11, 1941
| Those Who Have Made Good
| Clifford Burdette interviews Canada Lee, subject of the first episode of the series
|-
| June 9, 1941
| Salute to Canada Lee
| Nationwide Mutual Network program that concludes with Canada Lee and Ray Collins performing the last scene from Native SonCast: Paul Robeson (emcee), Eddie Anderson, Ray Collins, Duke Ellington, Canada Lee, Hattie McDaniel, Bill Robinson, Richard Wright
|-
| 1942
| Freedom's People
| "Contributions to the Theatre", final episode of an eight-part series sponsored by the U.S. Office of EducationCast: Canada Lee, Carol Bright, Maurice Ellis (narrator)
|-
| February 8, 1944
| Words at War
| "George Washington Carver"Cast: Fredric March, Canada Lee
|-
| March 5, 1944
| New World A-Comin| First episode in a weekly WMCA series written by Roi Ottley, based on his 1943 bookCast: Canada Lee (narrator), Muriel Smith
|-
| March 12, 1944
| New World A-Comin| "The Negro: Fascism and Democracy"Cast: Canada Lee, Muriel Smith (singing "When The Lights Go On Again All Over The World"), Ralph Bell, Will Geer
|-
| March 19, 1944
| New World A-Comin| "The Negro in Early America"; new series theme song by Duke EllingtonCast: Canada Lee, Muriel Smith, Leigh Whipper, Will Geer, Ralph Bell, John Ireland, Alexander Scourby
|-
| March 26, 1944
| New World A-Comin| "The Negro in Entertainment"Cast: Canada Lee, Hazel Scott, Bill Wirges, Hester Sondergaard, Ralph Bell
|-
| April 2, 1944
| New World A-Comin| "Ghettos"Cast: Canada Lee, Ethel Everett, Hilda Ottley, Humphrey Davis, Ken Reynard, Leigh Whipper, Martin Wolfson, Muriel Smith, Ralph Bell, Richard Huey
|-
| April 9, 1944
| New World A-Comin| "The Negro and Health"Cast: Canada Lee, Ethel Everett, Hilda Ottley, James Fuller, Joseph Julian, Martin Wolfson, Ralph Bell, Andrew Pendleton
|-
| April 16, 1944
| New World A-Comin| "The Story of Negro Humor", adapted from Langston Hughes' "White Folks Do Some Funny Things"Cast: Canada Lee, Clarence Foster, David Kerman, Grace Rogrers, Leigh Whipper, Martin Wolfson, Maxine Sullivan, Andrew Pendleton
|-
| April 23, 1944
| New World A-Comin'''
| "The Story Behind the Headline in the Negro Press"Cast: Canada Lee, Gordon Heath, Grace Rogers, Hilda Ottley, Martin Wolfson, Ralph Bell
|-
| April 25, 1944
| Columbia Presents Corwin| "Dorie Got a Medal", Norman Corwin's biographical ballad about Doris MillerCast: Canada Lee, Josh White, Mary Lou Williams, Laura Duncan, Jim Backus
|-
| April 30, 1944
| New World A-Comin
| "The Story of the Negro Church in New York"Cast: Maurice Ellis (narrator), Canada Lee, Hilda Ottley, Ralph Bell, Randolph Eckles, Betty Berghart, Bill Lipton, Sanford Bickart
|-
| May 14, 1944
| New World A-Comin
| "The Colored Orphan Asylum"Cast: Canada Lee (narrator), Ethel Everett, Laurina Scott, Hilda Ottley, Jimmy Wright, Ralph Bell, Alexander Scourby, Eugene Boyd, Doris Black
|-
| May 21, 1944
| New World A-Comin
| "The Story of James Pearson"Cast: Canada Lee (narrator), Joseph Julian, Ralph Bell, Martin Wolfson, Norman Rose, Betty Berghart, Randolph Eckles, Michael Everett, Sanford Bickart, Eric Roberts
|-
| May 28, 1944
| New World A-Comin
| "The Story of Ted Morgan, a Negro Reporter"Cast: Maurice Ellis (narrator), Canada Lee, Hilda Ottley, Ralph Bell, Randolph Eckles, Betty Berghart, Bill Lipton, Sanford Bickart, John Velasco
|-
| June 4, 1944
| New World A-Comin
| "Life in the Ghetto"Cast: Dr. Algernon Black (guest speaker), Canada Lee, Algernon Blackwood, Betty Berghart, Fred Carter, Grace Rogers, Howard Smith, Jimmy Wright, Ken Reynard, McKeeter Anderson, Sanford Bickart
|-
| June 18, 1944
| New World A-Comin
| "The Mammy Legend"Cast: Canada Lee, Eric Roberts, Ethel Everett, Georgette Harvey, Lurene Scott, Ralph Bell, Sanford Bickart
|-
| June 25, 1944
| New World A-Comin
| "The Story of Negro Music" (last show of the first season)Cast: Canada Lee (narrator), Billie Holiday, Slam Stewart, Josh White, Charlie Shavers, The Hall Johnson Choir, Art Tatum, Ben Webster, Benny Morton, Roy Eldridge, Vic Dickenson, Edmond Hall, Arthur Trappe, Al Casey
|-
| October 22, 1944
| New World A-Comin| "The Vermont Experiment" (first show of the second season)Cast: Canada Lee (narrator), Lurene Scott, Joyce Michael, Frederick O'Neal, Daniel Whittaker, Ronald Liss, Humphrey Davis, Richard Coogan, Paula Bowersmith
|-
| November 12, 1944
| New World A-Comin| "Inside Harlem Hospitals"Cast: Canada Lee, Celeste Holm, Muriel Smith, Hilda Simms
|-
| November 19, 1944
| New World A-Comin| "The Life and Music of W. C. Handy"Cast: Canada Lee, John Kirby and His Orchestra, Josh White, Leigh Whipper
|-
| November 26, 1944
| New World A-Comin| "Parachutes for Democracy"Cast: Canada Lee, Alan Devitt, Andrew Pendleton, Frederick O'Neal, Harry Davis, Isabel Martin, Jerry Shears, Joseph Boland, Richard Coogan, Sanford Bickart
|-
| 1944
| Treasury Briefs
| "Sixth War Loan Talks"Cast: Canada Lee
|-
| 1944?
| Treasury Star Parade
| "I Got Wings", drama about the first black pilots in the Air ForceCast: Canada Lee
|-
| January 28, 1945
| New World A-Comin| "Roll Call"Cast: Canada Lee, Myron McCormick
|-
| February 4, 1945
| New World A-Comin'''
| "There are Things to Do"Cast: Canada Lee, Miriam Hopkins
|-
| February 8, 1945
| The American School of the Air| "Dr. George Washington Carver, Scientist"Cast: Carl Van Doren (host), Canada Lee
|-
| February 11, 1945
| New World A-Comin
| "They Knew Lincoln"Cast: Canada Lee, Frank Wilson (narrator), Georgia Burke, Richard Coogan, Sanford Bickart, Walter Mosley
|-
| April 1, 1945
| New World A-Comin
| "The Negro in Early America"Cast: Canada Lee, Charles Perry, Don Gibson, Fred Carter, Georgia Burke, Hilda Simms, Jerry Shears, John Adair, Sanford Bickart (narrator), Will Geer
|-
| April 15, 1945
| New World A-Comin
| Tribute to the late President Franklin D. RooseveltCast: Canada Lee (reading FDR's famous D-Day prayer), U.S. Rep. Adam Clayton Powell, Jr. (presenting a eulogy), Channing Tobias, Muriel Smith, Sheldon Hale Bishop, William Franklin
|-
| April 22, 1945
| New World A-Comin
| "The Story of Negro Nurses"Cast: Anne Burr, Canada Lee, Charles Perry, Don Gibson, Fred Carter, Georgia Burke, Hilda Simms, Jack Gordon, Jerry Shears, John Adair
|-
| April 29, 1945
| New World A-Comin
| "Report from the Front"Cast: Canada Lee, Charles Perry, Don Gibson, Fred Carter, Frederick O'Neal, Jerry Shears, John Adair, Paul Mann
|-
| May 20, 1945
| New World A-Comin'''
| "The Meaning of V-E Day to Negroes"Cast: Oliver Harrington, Canada Lee, Portia White
|-
| May 27, 1945
| New World A-Comin'| "The Wind at My Back" (end of season one)Cast: Canada Lee, Juano Hernandez
|-
| July 17, 1945
| The Green Pastures| Transcribed for BBC broadcastCast: Daniel L. Haynes, Oscar Polk, Georgette Harvey, Amanda Randolph, Edna Thomas, Viola Dean, Canada Lee, Maurice Ellis, Kenneth Spencer, Fred O'Neal, Alvin Childress, Juano Hernandez
|-
| November 11, 1945
| Theatre Guild on the Air| "The Emperor Jones"Cast: Canada Lee (The Emperor)
|-
| 1945
| Two Men on a Raft| National USO–YMCA race relations program about two men lost at sea who must depend on each otherCast: Raymond Massey, Canada Lee
|-
| 1946
| Lest We Forget: These Brave Americans| "The Story of George Washington Carver"Cast: Juano Hernandez, Canada Lee
|-
| May 31, 1947
| This Is Jazz| Cast: Rudi Blesh (host), Wild Bill Davison, Albert Nicholas, Joe Sullivan, Pops Foster, Danny Barker, Baby Dodds, Canada Lee, Blue Lou Barker
|-
| December 23, 1947
| A Music Version of "A Christmas Carol"| Cast: Canada Lee, Sarah Fussell, Jack Lazar, Artie Malvin, Barry Thompson (narrator), Abby Lewis, Janet Tyler, Tommy Anderson
|-
| 1947
| Lest We Forget: The American Dream| "The Story of the Carolina Kid"Cast: Canada Lee
|-
| April 16, 1948
| The Colgate Sports Newsreel| Cast: Bill Stern (host), Canada Lee
|-
| December 5, 1948
| You Are There| "The Execution of Maximillian"Cast: Canada Lee, Don Hollenbeck, Ned Calmer, Quincy Howe, Richard C. Hottelet, Art Hannes, Ken Roberts, Guy Sorel, Michael Ingram, Elspeth Eric, Harold Huber, William Podmore, Ann Shephard, Roc Rogers, Bert Cowlan
|-
| January 2, 1949
| You Are There| "The Surrender of Sitting Bull"Cast: Karl Swenson, John Daly, Ken Roberts, Don Hollenbeck, Peter Hobbs, Julian Noa, Crazy Bull, Canada Lee, Raymond Edward Johnson
|-
| January 23, 1949
| You Are There| "The Betrayal of Toussant L'Ouverture"Cast: George Coulouris, Canada Lee, Joe DeSantis, Guy Sorel, John Daly, Don Hollenbeck, Quincy Howe, Ken Roberts, Richard Newton
|-
| February 21, 1949
| Turning Points| "Savior of the South", biography of George Washington CarverCast: Canada Lee
|-
| April 10, 1949
| You Are There| "Peary's Dash to the North Pole"Cast: Eric Dressler, Canada Lee, Staats Cotsworth, Matt Crowley, John Daly, Ned Calmer, Marie Ahnighito Peary, Cliff Carpenter, Joseph Conway, John Merlin, Guy Sorel
|-
| May 1, 1949
| You Are There| "Montezuma and the Spaniards"Cast: Arnold Moss, Canada Lee, Don Hollenbeck, Douglas Edwards, Inge Adams, Joe DeSantis, John Daly, Ken Roberts (announcer), Luis Van Rooten, Quincy Howe
|-
| June 8, 1949
| The Big Story| Investigating the case of Jamie Goodwin, sentenced to 40 years for a murder he didn't commitCast: Robert Sloane (narrator), Canada Lee
|-
| June 12, 1949
| You Are There| "Caesar Crosses the Rubicon"Cast: Art Hannes, Canada Lee, Douglas Edwards, Guy Sorel, John Daly, Malcolm Keen, Ned Calmer, Quincy Howe, Staats Cotsworth, Torin Thatcher
|-
| September 23, 1949
| The Barry Gray Show| Canada Lee is interviewed and discusses the blacklist
|}

References

Further reading
 Grant, Nicholas. “Crossing the Black Atlantic: The Global Antiapartheid Movement and the Racial Politics of the Cold War.” Radical History Review, 2014, no. 119, 2014.
 Hill, Erroll. Shakespeare in Sable: A History of Black Shakespearean Actors. Amherst: University of Massachusetts Press, 1984.
 Leiter, Samuel. Encyclopedic Dictionary of the New York Stage, 1940–1950. New York: Greenwood Press, 1992.
 Smith, Mona Z., Becoming Something: The Story of Canada Lee, London: Faber and Faber 2004. 
 Rampersad, Arnold. The Life of Langston Hughes. 2 volumes. Oxford: Oxford University Press, 2002.
 Woll, Allen. Dictionary of the Black Theatre: Broadway, Off-Broadway, and Selected Harlem Theatre. New York: Greenwood Press, 1983.

External links

 
 Biography at the African American Registry
 
  of the Canada Lee Heritage Foundation
 Canada Lee: Man Out Front documentary website (archived)
 
 Becoming Something: The Story of Canada Lee book website (archived)
 Native Son: Best-Selling Novel is Turned into Tense Drama Strikingly Staged by Orson Welles Life'', April 7, 1941, pp. 94–96 

1907 births
1952 deaths
20th-century American male actors
African-American male actors
American anti-capitalists
American male film actors
American people of West Indian descent
Articles containing video clips
Burials at Woodlawn Cemetery (Bronx, New York)
Hollywood blacklist
Male actors from New York City
Federal Theatre Project people